Hare Rama Hare Krishna may refer to:

 Hare Rama Hare Krishna (1971 film), a Hindi language film directed by Dev Anand
 Hare Rama Hare Krishna (2011 film), a Kannada language film directed by CV. Ashok Kumar
 Hare Rama Hare Krishna, the working title of Jalsa, a 2008 Telugu language film directed by Trivikram Srinivas
 The Hare Krishna (mantra) mantra, consisting of the words Hare Rama and Hare Krishna
 The International Society for Krishna Consciousness

See also 
 Hare Krishna (disambiguation)